The DuPage Theatre and DuPage Shoppes, nicknamed "The Duper", was a historic movie theater in Lombard, Illinois.

History
The 800 capacity theater was designed by R. G. Wolff, who formerly worked for Rapp and Rapp. Wolff was a consultant for the Chicago Theatre. The theater was named after the county in an effort to bring out-of-town customers to the shows. Built in 1927, The DuPage was a Spanish Patio style theater (like the Uptown), that also incorporated commercial and residential aspects in its buildings. The theater was originally a single screen but in its last years divided up into 2 screens playing $1 movies. As a small town, the six shops incorporated into the theater comprised a large portion of the village's commerce at the time. The shops and theater also benefited from their proximity to the Chicago and North Western Railway. 

The DuPage Theatre and DuPage Shoppes were added to the National Register of Historic Places in 1987. In 1990, Paul Anderson, and Fatal Beauty Studios (a local recording studio) attempted to open the theatre as a concert hall, but the Village Board turned them down. In the interim, the theatre lay vacant until 2000, when the property was purchased by Big Idea Productions, Inc., a producer of children's videos. The company planned to renovate the theater and use the other space for their corporate headquarters. They pulled out after determining that the site would not be large enough for their plans, and returned the theater to village ownership. Lombard appointed several committees to oversee the feasibility to rehabilitate the theater. Their efforts were ultimately fruitless, and in May 2007, the DuPage Theatre and DuPage Shoppes were demolished. They were removed from the National Register in 2020. The land where the building stood remained vacant until 2021, when ground was broken for new luxury apartments.

References
 National Register of Historic Places Registration Form: DuPage Theatre and DuPage Shoppes

Notes

Lombard, Illinois
National Register of Historic Places in DuPage County, Illinois
Theatres completed in 1928
Theatres on the National Register of Historic Places in Illinois
Commercial buildings on the National Register of Historic Places in Illinois
1928 establishments in Illinois
Former National Register of Historic Places in Illinois